Virginia Highlands Community College is a public community college in Abingdon, Virginia. It is part of the Virginia Community College System.  The college was established November 30, 1967 to serve the residents of Washington County, western Smyth County, and the city of Bristol. Over 3,000 students are enrolled each semester.

Campus
The VHCC campus buildings include:
 OTC Building
 LRC Building
 ADM Building
 MEC Building
 ISC Building
 NEB Building
 GRN Building

Tuition
Virginia residents, as well as Tennessee residents within a 30-mile radius, pay $157.00 per credit per semester credit hour; out-of-state residents pay $354.60 per semester credit hour.

Notable alumni
 Doug Blevins, 1985, gained national recognition for coaching professional football's premier kickers from a motorized wheelchair; received the 2014 Outstanding Alumni Award from the American Association of Community Colleges
 Richard Leigh, 1973, songwriter; winner of a Grammy Award; has had eight No. 1 hits on the country music charts; received the 2011 Outstanding Alumni Award from the American Association of Community Colleges

References

External links
 Official website

Virginia Community College System
Educational institutions established in 1967
Universities and colleges accredited by the Southern Association of Colleges and Schools
Education in Washington County, Virginia
1967 establishments in Virginia